Karl Michael Vogler (28 August 1928 – 9 June 2009) was a German actor, probably best known for his appearances in several big-budget English language films. In The Blue Max (1966), he co-starred with George Peppard and Ursula Andress as the squadron commander, and in Patton (1970), he portrayed General Erwin Rommel. In between, he was in Robert Redford's Downhill Racer (1969) as a ski company owner.

Vogler primarily worked in German film and television, often typecast as authority figures. He was also an acclaimed stage actor, perhaps best remembered for playing Horatio to Maximilian Schell's Hamlet in 1960's Munich August Festival and a subsequent television adaptation.

Born in Remscheid, Germany and brought up in Bregenz, Austria, Vogler was the son of a blacksmith. After graduation, he started his career as theatre actor and made his debut in Innsbruck in 1950. Between the 1970s and 2005 he made appearances on German TV and European films.

Vogler died at age 80 in Seehausen am Staffelsee, Germany.

Selected filmography 

 The Man Who Walked Through the Wall (1959) - Junger eleganter Herr 
  (1963) - Lukas
  (1963) - Klaus Hartmann
 A Man in His Prime (1964) - Richard Mertens
 Karl Sand (1964, TV film) - Karl Sand
 Don't Tell Me Any Stories (1964) - Dr. Nikolaus Feyl
 Those Magnificent Men in Their Flying Machines (1965) - Captain Rumpelstoss
 Der Fall Rouger (1966, TV film) - Authier
 The Blue Max (1966) - Heidemann
 The Lark (1966, TV film) - Earl of Warwick
 Die Geschichte des Rittmeisters Schach von Wuthenow (1966, TV film) - Schach von Wuthenow
 Graf Kozsibrovszky macht ein Geschäft (1966, TV film) - Graf Kozsibrovszky
 Die Zimmerwirtin (1967, TV film) - Monsieur Tienne
 Spiel mit dem Tode (1967, TV film) - Glybowitsch
 Ein Toter braucht kein Alibi (1967, TV film) - Steve Craig
 In Lemgo 89 (1967, TV film) - Dietrich Kleinsorge
 How I Won the War (1967) - Odlebog
 The Dance of Death (1967) - Kurt
 Verräter (1967, TV miniseries) - Larry Edwards
 Fliegender Sand (1967, TV film) - Hans Joachim Gräf
 Feldwebel Schmid (1968, TV film) - Anton Schmid
 Zeit der halben Herzen (1968, TV film) - Wilhelm Forster
  (1968, TV miniseries) - Paul Wunderland
 Der Fall Wera Sassulitsch (1968, TV film) - Alexandrow
 Othello (1968, TV film) - Cassio
  (1968) - Walter Riemeck
 Affaire Dreyfus (1968, TV miniseries) - Captain Alfred Dreyfus
 House of Pleasure (1969) - Prince Borghese
 Charley's Uncle (1969) - Boy Deisen
  (1969, TV film) - Christoph Kolumbus
 Sir Basil Zaharoff – Makler des Todes (1969, TV film) - Jerome
 Downhill Racer (1969) - Machet
 Die Reise nach Tilsit (1969, TV film) - Ansas Balczus
 Der irische Freiheitskampf (1969, TV film) - Éamon de Valera
 Patton (1970) - Field Marshal Erwin Rommel
  (1970) - Father
 Deep End (1970) - Swimming instructor
 Trauer muß Elektra tragen (1970, TV film) - Adam Brant
 Die Heirat (1970, TV film) - Kochkaryov
 Fröhliche Weihnachten (1970, TV film) - Peter Eckert
 Der Kommissar: Ende eines Tanzvergnügens (1971, TV series episode) - Barbosse
 Die Eroberung (1971, TV film) - Dupetit
 Maestro der Revolution? (1971, TV film) - Verdi
 Alpha Alpha (1972, TV series) - Alpha
 Sonderdezernat K1: Vier Schüsse auf den Mörder (1972, TV series episode) - Dieter Delfs
 Monsieur Chasse – Wie man Hasen jagt (1972, TV film) -  	Moricet
 Kara Ben Nemsi Effendi (1973-1975, TV series) - Kara Ben Nemsi
 Tatort: Kneipenbekanntschaft (1974, TV series episode) - Höfer
 Le vieux fusil (1976) - Docteur Müller
 Shout at the Devil (1976) - Von Kleine
  (1976) - Polizeioffizier
 Derrick: Kalkutta (1976, TV series episode) - Keppler
  (1977, TV film) - Colonel Alexandre
 Des Doktors Dilemma (1977, TV film) - Sir Colenso Ridgeon
  (1978, TV series, 13 episodes) - Bodo von Senden
  (1978, TV miniseries) - Pater Magni 
 Mihail, câine de circ (Freundschaft wider Willen; 1979) - Dag Daughtry
  (1981, TV film) - John
  (1981, TV film) - Grandfather
 Die Rosen von Dublin (1981, TV miniseries) - Fritz Hutzinger
 The Ring (1984) - Crainicul arenei de box 
 Segeln macht frei (1986)
  (1992, TV film) - Dr. Castellotti
  (1995, TV miniseries) - VanLück

External links 
 
 Biografie von Karl-Michael Vogler (German)

1928 births
2009 deaths
People from Remscheid
German male film actors
German male stage actors
German male television actors
20th-century German male actors
People from Garmisch-Partenkirchen (district)